William Vaughn may refer to:
William J. Vaughn, American university professor, librarian and book collector
William S. Vaughn (1903–1996), president and CEO of Eastman Kodak
Billy Vaughn, singer
Bill Vaughn, a fictional CIA agent from the American TV series Alias, father of main character Michael Vaughn

See also
William Vaughan (disambiguation)